Vinodol is a village and municipality in the Nitra District in western central Slovakia, in the Nitra Region. It is mostly agricultural settlement.

History

Geography
It has a population of about 1888 people.

Ethnicity
The population is about 93% Slovak, 4% Magyar and 2% Gypsy.

External links
http://www.statistics.sk/mosmis/eng/run.html
http://www.obec-vinodol.sk

Villages and municipalities in Nitra District